Hylaeonympha is a genus of damselfly in the family Coenagrionidae. It contains the following species:
 Hylaeonympha magoi

References 

Coenagrionidae
Zygoptera genera
Taxonomy articles created by Polbot